Carex ecuadorica is a tussock-forming perennial in the family Cyperaceae. It is native to parts of South America.

See also
 List of Carex species

References

ecuadorica
Plants described in 1904
Taxa named by Georg Kükenthal
Flora of Ecuador
Flora of Argentina
Flora of Peru
Flora of Bolivia